Cinta Kura Kura ("Tortoise love") is a Malaysian comedy film produced by KRU Studios in 2012. It features Tiz Zaqyah, Aeril Zafrel and Zizan Razak.It is set for release on 1 March 2012. This films tells us about Nani, a bubbly 21-year-old girl and her unique pet tortoise, Nico.

Synopsis
Cinta Kura-Kura is a romantic comedy that tells the tale of Nani, a bubbly 21-year-old girl, and her unique pet turtle, Nico. Nico is unique as he is a rare Green Crown Sea Turtle… but more importantly, Nico has the ability to talk to humans, if he so chooses to do so.

Nani has recently moved in with her younger brother, Amin, and seems to be falling for the budding musician neighbour, Adam. Disturbed by this budding romance, Nico does everything possible to sabotage Adam's efforts to woo Nani. A love triangle develops when Nico's favourite pet shop supervisor, Fadzly tries to get close to Nani. However unbeknownst to all, his intentions are far from honourable as his actions are motivated by his goal to capture and sell Nico to an exotic food restaurant. This hilarious flick features cutting edge character animation with the lively Nico, coupled with a strong dose of witty comedy and dialogue, creating a fun, cheeky romantic comedy that will appeal to the young and young-at-heart.

Cast

Main cast
 Tiz Zaqyah as Nani
 Aeril Zafrel as Adam
Zizan Razak as Nico

Extended cast
 Fara Fauzana as Mira
 Usop Wilcha as Atok
 Fizz Fairuz as Fadzly
 Bob Yusof as Amin
 Munir as Zul
 Noryati Taib as Mak Uda
 Chew Kin Wah as Mr. Lim
 Harun Salim Bachik as Nazri
 Daus AF8 as Zek
 Tauke as Salleh
 Erwin Shah Dawson as Herman

Cameo
 Patrick Lim Moey Cheng as Big Boss
 Sabrina Mohamed Ali as Big Boss Girlfriend
 Mohamad Sharifman Omar as Bodyguard 1
 Muhammad Harminder Singh as Bodyguard 2
 Tan Ai Nee as Waitress 1
 Jainis Mangkoi (Jeany) as Waitress 2
 Masshila Abd Talib as Waitress 3
 Thomas Lee Teck Hock as Cook 1
 Mohd Jasbir Khan Mohd Johari as Cook 2
 Kanapathy a/l Karunakaran as Cook 3
 Eddie Afro & The Geng as Busker

Soundtrack

Awards and nominations

References

External links
 
 Cinta Kura Kura facebook

2012 films
2012 romantic comedy films
Malaysian romantic comedy films